In Greek mythology, Phthia (/ˈθaɪə/; Greek: Φθία or Φθίη Phthía) may refer to the following individuals:

 Phthia, the nymph mother of Dorus by King Hellen of Thessaly, the progenitor of the Hellenes. Her husband may be named his kingdom, Phthia, in honour of her. Phthia might be the same with Orseis (Othreis), the usual oread consort of Hellen and mother of his children, Aeolus, Dorus and Xuthus.
 Phthia, daughter of Phoroneus and mother of Achaeus by the god Zeus. This version is to some extent confirmed by Aelian, who relates that Zeus assumed the shape of a dove to seduce a certain Phthia.
 Phthia, the beloved of Apollo, by whom she became the mother of Dorus, Laodocus, and Polypoetes.
 Phthia, a Theban princess who was one of the Niobids, children of Amphion, king of Thebes, and Niobe, daughter of Tantalus.
 Phthia or Clytia, the concubine of Amyntor who falsely accused her stepson, Phoenix, of seduction causing his father to blind him.

Notes

References 

 Claudius Aelianus, Varia Historia translated by Thomas Stanley (d.1700) edition of 1665. Online version at the Topos Text Project.
 Claudius Aelianus, Claudii Aeliani de natura animalium libri xvii, varia historia, epistolae, fragmenta, Vol 2. Rudolf Hercher. In Aedibus B.G. Teubneri. Lipsiae. 1866. Greek text available at the Perseus Digital Library.
 Gaius Julius Hyginus, Fabulae from The Myths of Hyginus translated and edited by Mary Grant. University of Kansas Publications in Humanistic Studies. Online version at the Topos Text Project.
 Pseudo-Apollodorus, The Library with an English Translation by Sir James George Frazer, F.B.A., F.R.S. in 2 Volumes, Cambridge, MA, Harvard University Press; London, William Heinemann Ltd. 1921. Online version at the Perseus Digital Library. Greek text available from the same website.
 Pseudo-Clement, Recognitions from Ante-Nicene Library Volume 8, translated by Smith, Rev. Thomas. T. & T. Clark, Edinburgh. 1867. Online version at theio.com

Women of Apollo
Mortal parents of demigods in classical mythology
Women in Greek mythology
Aetolian characters in Greek mythology
Theban characters in Greek mythology
Mythology of Argolis
Thessalian mythology